Megan Valler (born 19 February 1981) is a former Australian rugby union player. She was selected in Australia's squad for the 2007 O'Reilly Cup against New Zealand. She made her international debut for the Wallaroos in the first test against the Black Ferns in Whanganui. She also featured in the second test in Porirua, it was her final appearance for the side.

References 

1981 births
Living people
Australian female rugby union players
Australia women's international rugby union players